Francisco Vázquez González (born 1 May 1983), more commonly known as Fran Vázquez, is a retired Spanish professional basketball player. Originally drafted by the Orlando Magic in 2005, Vázquez decided to remain in the Spanish ACB League rather than enter the National Basketball Association (NBA). He is the Spanish League's all-time leader in blocked shots.

Professional career
Vázquez was selected 11th overall in the 2005 NBA draft by the Orlando Magic. He made headlines when he announced that he would remain playing in the Spanish ACB League for at least the following season, after signing for Akasvayu Girona. This came as a surprise to the Magic, who expected him to join Dwight Howard in the front court for the 2005–06 season, and it enraged many Magic fans.

Vázquez originally gave no indication that he would be returning to Europe after he was drafted, and had indicated that he would like to join the Magic. The Magic retained his NBA rights while he played in non-NBA leagues. In 2010, Vázquez signed a one-year contract extension with the EuroLeague club Barcelona.

In July 2012, Barcelona decided to trade his rights to Unicaja for the rights of Álex Abrines, who moved to FC Barcelona.

On 17 April 2016, in a game against MoraBanc Andorra, Vázquez became the top shot-blocker in Liga ACB history, after surpassing the record of 671 blocks made by Fernando Romay.

On 29 July 2016 Vázquez signed a two-year deal with Iberostar Tenerife.

On 18 July 2018 he signed a two-year deal with Tecnyconta Zaragoza of the Liga ACB.

On 7 May 2020 Vázquez announced his retirement.

International career
Vázquez played with the senior men's Spain national team at the EuroBasket 2005 and the 2010 FIBA World Championship.

Awards and accomplishments

Club honors
EuroLeague (1):
2010
ACB League (Spanish League) (3)
2008–09, 2010–11, 2011–12
Spanish King's Cup (4):
2005, 2007, 2010, 2011
Spanish Super Cup (3):
2009, 2010, 2011

Spanish junior national team
2002 FIBA Europe Under-20 Championship:

Individual awards
Spanish King's Cup MVP (1):
 2010
ACB League Player of the Week (5):
 Weeks 17 and 27 (2004–05)
 Weeks 15, 26 and 27 (2008–09)
ACB League Player of the Month (1):
 March (2009)
All-ACB Team (1):
2009
Liga ACB all-time leader in blocked shots

References

External links

 Fran Vázquez at acb.com 
 Fran Vázquez at draftexpress.com
 Fran Vázquez at euroleague.net
 Fran Vázquez at fiba.com

1983 births
Living people
2010 FIBA World Championship players
Baloncesto Málaga players
Basket Zaragoza players
Bilbao Basket players
CB Canarias players
CB Girona players
CB Gran Canaria players
Centers (basketball)
FC Barcelona Bàsquet players
Liga ACB players
Orlando Magic draft picks
People from Lugo (comarca)
Sportspeople from the Province of Lugo
Power forwards (basketball)
Spanish men's basketball players